"Rendez-Vous" is a 1998 song recorded by German Eurodance band Culture Beat featuring American singer Kim Sanders. It was released as the second single from their fourth studio album, Metamorphosis (1998), and peaked at number 38 in Austria, number 48 in Sweden and number 53 in Germany. A music video was also produced to promote the single.

Track listing

Charts

References

1998 singles
Culture Beat songs
Kim Sanders songs
1998 songs
Columbia Records singles
English-language German songs